Mel and Norma Gabler were religious fundamentalists active in United States school textbook reform between 1961 and the 2000s based in Longview, Texas.

Melvin Nolan Freeman Gabler was born in Katy, Texas and died at age 89 on December 19, 2004, after suffering a brain hemorrhage two days prior. He served in the Army Air Force during World War II and later worked for Esso, a precursor of Exxon Mobil, retiring in 1974. Norma Elizabeth Gabler was born in Garrett, Texas on June 16, 1923, and died on July 22, 2007, from Parkinson's disease.

The Gablers founded Educational Research Analysts and formally incorporated as a non-profit organization in 1973.

References

Further reading 

 
 

Married couples
Education reform
Christian fundamentalists